Death by Death is a 2016 Belgian black-comedy film directed by Xavier Seron. It premiered at the 2016 Palm Springs International Film Festival. The film received seven nominations at the 7th Magritte Awards, including Best Film and Best Director for Seron.

Cast
 Jean-Jacques Rausin as Michel Peneud
 Myriam Boyer as Monique Peneud
 Fanny Touron as Aurélie
 Serge Riaboukine as Darek
 Catherine Salée as The doctor
 Jackie Berroyer as The waiting man

Accolades

See also
 List of black-and-white films produced since 1970

References

External links
 

2016 films
2016 black comedy films
2016 comedy-drama films
Belgian black-and-white films
Belgian black comedy films
Belgian comedy-drama films
French black-and-white films
French black comedy films
French comedy-drama films
2010s French-language films
2016 directorial debut films
French-language Belgian films
2010s French films